The Cambrian Period was the first geological period of the Paleozoic Era, 539–485 million years ago.

Cambrian may also refer to the following:

 Cambria, the Latin name for Cymru (Wales)

Places
Cambrian Heights, Calgary, Alberta, Canada
Cambrian Mountains, a mountain range in Wales
Cambrian, New Zealand, or Cambrian's, a former gold-mining settlement in Mount Ida (New Zealand electorate), Otago
Cambrian Park, San Jose, California, United States

Newspapers
Cambrian News, a Welsh newspaper
The Cambrian, a former Welsh newspaper founded in 1806 
 , a Welsh-language newspaper printed in the United States, 1880–1919
The Cambrian, a newspaper serving Cambria, California, owned by The Tribune of San Luis Obispo

Transportation
Cambrian Railways, a defunct railway company in Wales
Cambrian Heritage Railways, a heritage railway in Oswestry, Shropshire, England
Cambrian Line, a railway in Wales, United Kingdom
Cambrian Coast Express, a named passenger train on the Cambrian Line
Cambrian Airways, a Welsh airline begun in 1935, later absorbed by British Airways

Other uses
Cambrian & Clydach Vale B.&G.C., a football club in Wales
Cambrian College, in Greater Sudbury, Ontario, Canada
Cambrian Genomics, a defunct biotechnology company
Cambrian Pottery, a Welsh pottery 1764-1870
Cambrian School and College, in Bangladesh
Cambrian School District, in San Jose, California, U.S.
HMS Cambrian, the name of several Royal Navy ships

See also 

 Cambria (disambiguation)
 Cumbrian (disambiguation)
 Cymric (disambiguation), etymologically related to both Cambrian and Cumbrian
 Wales
Cambrian Colliery, a former coalmine in Wales
Cambrian Way, a long-distance footpath in Wales
 Exercise Cambrian Patrol, an annual patrolling competition in Wales